Guacimara is the name of a strong worrier  Guanche woman, daughter of the king or  Mencey of the  Menceyato of Anaga in the Canary Islands, at a time prior to the arrival of the European conquerors at the end of the XV century.

It appears for the first time as a personage in  Antonio de Viana's epic poem  Antigüedades de las Islas Afortunadas  published in 1604, from which it was copied by authors like Tomás Arias Marín de Cubas or José de Viera y Clavijo, so that there is no evidence of it being historical.

In the poem, Guacimara was the daughter of the historical ruler Beneharo and his only heir, although the physician Juan Bethencourt Alfonso added that Beneharo had two other brothers: a boy, baptized Enrique and Guajara, wife of Tinguaro.

References 

Guacimara
Guanche
Guanche people
Year of birth unknown